Hans Herr (September 17, 1639 – October 11, 1725) was born in Zürich, Switzerland.  While often cited as a descendant of the knight Hugo Herr, scholarship done in the 20th century has put this claim in doubt.  He joined the Swiss Brethren (later called Mennonites) and became a bishop. He was the first Mennonite bishop to emigrate to America.

When religious persecution became unendurable in Switzerland, many of his congregation emigrated with him to the Electorate of the Palatinate in Germany, which was governed by a ruler who promised them protection and religious freedom.  This was satisfactory until the Palatinate fell into the hands of other rulers, subjecting the Mennonites to severe religious persecution once again. When this occurred, a number of them visited William Penn in London, in 1707, and arranged terms with him to colonize a portion of what is now Lancaster County, near what was then the western frontier of Pennsylvania. In 1710, Hans Herr, John R. Bundely, Martin Meylin (Mylin), Martin Kendig, Jacob Miller, Hans Funk, Hans Graff, Martin Oberholtzer, Wendel Bowman and others bought 10,000 acres (40 km²) of land on the south side of Pequea Creek.  A warrant was issued for the land October 10, 1710, and it was surveyed October 23, 1710.

The tradition, which has never been disproven, is that these immigrants held a conference as to what steps should be taken to inform their relatives and friends in Europe of their opinions and expectations of their new lands, and it was determined that Hans Herr, their revered minister, should return, explain the situation and the great advantages of emigration, and bring with him those he could induce to come. He sailed to Europe and returned to America with many more immigrants, despite making the journey at 70 years old. He had six sons and one daughter by his wife Elizabeth Kendig. He died in West Lampeter Township on October 11, 1725.

House and museum

The Hans Herr House, built by his son Christian Herr in 1719, is open to the public as a museum, and is the oldest Pennsylvania German settlement still in existence today. The house is located at 1849 Hans Herr Drive in Willow Street, Pennsylvania.

References

External links

The 1719 Hans Herr House & Museum

Herr, Hans
Herr, Hans
18th-century American bishops
18th-century Mennonite bishops
Herr, Hans
People of colonial Pennsylvania
Herr
People from Zürich
American Mennonites
18th-century American clergy